Gottlieb Ferdinand Albert Alexis Graf von Haeseler (January 19, 1836 – October 25, 1919) was a German military officer of the Imperial Wilhelmine period, with final rank of Generalfeldmarschall.

Biography
Haeseler was born in Potsdam to August Alexis Eduard Haeseler and Albertine von Schönermark. He entered the Prussian army as Lieutenant in 1853 and became aide-de-camp of Prince Frederick Charles of Prussia in 1860. He served in the Danish-Prussian War (1864), the Austro-Prussian War (1866), and the Franco-Prussian War (1870–71). From 1879 he headed the military history department of the general staff, and from 1890-1903 he was General of the Cavalry and head of the XVI Army Corps in Metz. In 1905 he received the rank of a Generalfeldmarschall. From 1903 he was member of the Prussian House of Lords and worked for the development of the vocational school system. Haeseler died in Harnekop.

Among other things, the barracks of the paratrooper battalion No. 261 in Lebach/Saar are named after Haeseler.

Awards
 Iron Cross II Class (1870)
 Iron Cross I Class (1870)  
 Pour le Mérite (19 January 1873)
 Order of the Crown
 Merit Order of the Bavarian Crown
 Bavarian Military Merit Order
 Order of the Red Eagle
 Order of the White Falcon
 Friedrich Order
 Order of the Black Eagle
 House Order of Hohenzollern
 Order of Berthold the First (1895)
 House Order of Fidelity (1903)
 Austrian Imperial Order of Leopold (1877)
 Imperial Order of the Iron Crown with War Decoration (1864)

Notes

Literature 
 Jürgen Hahn-Butry (Hrsg.): Preußisch-deutsche Feldmarschälle und Großadmirale. Safari, Berlin 1938.
 Gottlieb Graf von Haeseler: Zehn Jahre im Stabe des Prinzen Friedrich Karl. 3 Bände. Mittler, Berlin 1910–1915 (Digitalisat: Band 2)

References

External links
 

1836 births
1919 deaths
Recipients of the Iron Cross (1870), 1st class
Field marshals of Prussia
Prussian military personnel of the Second Schleswig War
Prussian people of the Austro-Prussian War
German military personnel of the Franco-Prussian War
Members of the Prussian House of Lords
Military personnel from Potsdam
People from the Province of Brandenburg
Recipients of the Pour le Mérite (military class)
Grand Crosses of the Military Merit Order (Bavaria)
Recipients of the Military Merit Cross (Mecklenburg-Schwerin), 1st class